William Cole Campbell (born 20 February 2006), commonly known as Cole Campbell, is an Icelandic footballer currently playing as a forward for Borussia Dortmund.

Early life
Campbell was born to Iceland international footballer Rakel Karvelsson, and an American father. He was raised mostly in the United States, but would regularly visit Iceland during the summers since the age of eight, training with professional side Fimleikafélag Hafnarfjarðar (FH).

Club career
In January 2020, Campbell moved permanently to Iceland, joining the Fimleikafélag Hafnarfjarðar team. Having progressed through the academy, he made his first team debut at the age of fifteen, becoming the second youngest player in FH history, behind Logi Hrafn Róbertsson, when he came on as a substitute for Jónatan Ingi Jónsson in a 5–0 win over Leiknir Reykjavík.

On 16 May 2022, following one further appearance for FH, it was announced that Campbell would join German side Borussia Dortmund, in the summer of the same year. The following day, he joined Breiðablik on a short-term deal, until his move to Dortmund in July. He left Iceland in June 2022, following one appearance with Breiðablik, ahead of his move to Dortmund.

International career
Eligible to represent both Iceland and the United States, Campbell has committed to represent Iceland at international level. He has represented Iceland at under-17 level.

Career statistics

Club

References

2006 births
Living people
Icelandic people of American descent
Icelandic footballers
Iceland youth international footballers
Association football forwards
Úrvalsdeild karla (football) players
Fimleikafélag Hafnarfjarðar players
Breiðablik UBK players
Borussia Dortmund players
Icelandic expatriate footballers
Icelandic expatriate sportspeople in Germany
Expatriate footballers in Germany